Narendra Kumar Prasadrao Salve (18 March 1921 – 1 April 2012) was a veteran Indian politician from Indian National Congress, parliamentarian and a cricket administrator.  Former Union minister and president of Board of Control for Cricket in India (BCCI) (1982–1985), he was instrumental in bringing the Cricket World Cup outside England and to the Indian subcontinent in 1987. Salve was a staunch advocate for the separate statehood of Vidarbha.

Early life and education
N. K. P. Salve was born in Chhindwara, Madhya Pradesh, on 18 March 1921 to Marathi Christians parents Prasadrao Keshavrao Salve and Cornelia Karuna Jadhav. His father was a lawyer and freedom fighter  from Ujjain and his Marathi mother was a renowned scholar, freedom fighter and the first woman in India to receive an honours degree in mathematics. Salve's grandfather Keshavrao Salve was a descendent of Shalivahanan dynasty.

Salve received B.Com. and F.C.A. degrees. He was a Chartered Accountant and was also an avid cricketer at college.

Career and cricket administration
A chartered accountant by profession, Salve played club cricket in Nagpur in his early years, and became an umpire in the following years. He was elected the President of Vidarbha Cricket Association (VCA) (1972–1980), and in 1982 was elected as the president of Board of Control for Cricket in India (BCCI), a post he held until 1985. During his tenure, India won the 1983 Cricket World Cup, the BCCI won the joint hosting right for the 1987 Cricket World Cup for India and Pakistan. In 1983, he also became the first elected chairman of the Asian Cricket Council. In recognition to services to cricket, the BCCI started the NKP Salve Challenger Trophy in 1995.

Political career

Salve was elected a member of the Lok Sabha (1967–1977) from Betul (Lok Sabha constituency) and appointed to the Rajya Sabha from Maharashtra state for four consecutive terms, from 1978 to 2002. He was the chairman of the Privileges Committee of the Lok Sabha from 1975 to 1977.

He left his accountancy practice when he first appointed a Union cabinet minister in 1982, by Prime Minister Indira Gandhi. He was appointed the Union Minister of State by Prime Ministers, Rajiv Gandhi and  P. V. Narasimha Rao, and also served at the Ministry of Information and Broadcasting, Steel and Mines, Parliamentary Affairs and Power. He was the chairman of the 9th Finance Commission of India (1984–89).

In 2003, along with former central cabinet minister Vasant Sathe, returned to Nagpur and formed the Vidarbha Rajya Nirman Congress to push the demand for a separate Vidarbha state.

Death

Salve died at a private hospital in New Delhi on 1 April 2012, following a brief illness. His body was flown into his native Nagpur, where he was given a state funeral, before being buried at a local Christian cemetery, the following day.

Personal life
His son, lawyer Harish Salve served as the Solicitor General of India from 1999 to 2002, while his daughter is Arundhati. His wife died a few years prior to him.

See also
 NKP Salve Challenger Trophy

References 

1921 births
2012 deaths
Indian National Congress politicians
Politicians from Nagpur
Indian accountants
Indian sports executives and administrators
Indian cricket administrators
Rajya Sabha members from Maharashtra
India MPs 1967–1970
India MPs 1971–1977
Union ministers of state of India
Indira Gandhi administration
Rajiv Gandhi administration
Rao administration
Indian cricket umpires
Cricket in Vidarbha
People from Chhindwara
Lok Sabha members from Madhya Pradesh
Presidents of the Board of Control for Cricket in India
Marathi politicians
People from Betul district
Indian Christians
Ministers of Power of India